Gun-type fission weapons are fission-based nuclear weapons whose design assembles their fissile material into a supercritical mass by the use of the "gun" method: shooting one piece of sub-critical material into another. Although this is sometimes pictured as two sub-critical hemispheres driven together to make a supercritical sphere, typically a hollow projectile is shot onto a spike which fills the hole in its center. Its name is a reference to the fact that it is shooting the material through an artillery barrel as if it were a projectile. 

Since it is a relatively slow method of assembly, plutonium cannot be used unless it is purely the 239 isotope. Production of impurity-free plutonium is very difficult and is impractical. The required amount of uranium is relatively large, and thus the overall efficiency is relatively low. The main reason for this is the uranium metal does not undergo compression (and resulting density increase) as does the implosion design. Instead, gun type bombs assemble the supercritical mass by amassing such a large quantity of uranium that the overall distance through which daughter neutrons must travel has so many mean free paths it becomes very probable most neutrons will find uranium nuclei to collide with, before escaping the supercritical mass.

The method was applied in four known programs. First, the "Little Boy" weapon which was detonated over Hiroshima and several additional units of the same design prepared after World War II, in 40 Mark 8 bombs, and their replacement, 40 Mark 11 bombs. Both the Mark 8 and Mark 11 designs were intended for use as earth-penetrating bombs (see nuclear bunker buster), for which the gun-type method was preferred for a time by designers who were less than certain that early implosion-type weapons would successfully detonate following an impact. The second program was a family of 11-inch (280 mm) nuclear artillery shells, the W9 and its derivative W19, plus a repackaged W19 in a 16-inch (406 mm) shell for US Navy battleships, the W23. The third family was an 8-inch (203 mm) artillery shell, the W33. Later, South Africa also developed six nuclear bombs based on the gun-type principle, and was working on missile warheads using the same basic design – See South Africa and weapons of mass destruction.

There are currently no known gun-type weapons in service: advanced nuclear weapon states tended to abandon the design in favor of the implosion-type weapons, boosted fission weapons, and thermonuclear weapons. New nuclear weapon states tend to develop boosted fission and thermonuclear weapons only. All known gun-type nuclear weapons previously built worldwide have been dismantled.

Little Boy

The "gun" method is roughly how the Little Boy weapon, which was detonated over Hiroshima, worked, using uranium-235 as its fissile material. The hollow cylindrical shape made it subcritical. It was powered by a cordite charge. Both the bullet and the target consisted of multiple rings stacked together.

The use of "rings" had two advantages: it allowed the larger bullet to confidently remain subcritical (the hollow column served to keep the material from having too much contact with other material), and it allowed sub-critical assemblies to be tested using the same bullet but with just one ring.

This means that some free neutrons may cause the chain reaction to take place before the material could be fully joined (see nuclear chain reaction).

Typically the chain reaction takes less than 1 μs (100 shakes), during which time the bullet travels only 0.3 mm. Although the chain reaction is slower when the supercriticality is low, it still happens in a time so short that the bullet hardly moves in that time.

This could cause a fizzle, a predetonation which would blow the material apart before creating much of an explosion. Thus, it is important that the frequency at which free neutrons occur is kept low, compared with the assembly time from this point. This also means that the speed of the projectile must be sufficiently high; its speed can be increased but this requires a longer and heavier barrel, or a higher pressure of the propellant gas for greater acceleration of the bullet subcritical mass.

In the case of Little Boy, the 20% U-238 in the uranium had 70 spontaneous fissions per second. With the fissionable material in a supercritical state, each gave a large probability of detonation: each fission creates on average 2.52 neutrons, which each have a probability of more than 1:2.52 of creating another fission. During the 1.35 ms of supercriticality prior to full assembly, there was a 10% probability of a fission, with somewhat less probability of pre-detonation.

Initially the Manhattan Project gun-type effort was directed at making a gun weapon that used plutonium as its source of fissile material, known as the "Thin Man" because of its extreme length. It was thought that if a plutonium gun-type bomb could be created, then the uranium gun-type bomb would be very easy to make by comparison. However, it was discovered in April 1944 that reactor-bred plutonium (Pu-239) is contaminated with another isotope of plutonium, Pu-240, which increases the material's spontaneous neutron-release rate, making pre-detonation inevitable. For this reason, a gun-type bomb is thought to only be usable with enriched-uranium fuel. It is unknown though possible to make a composite design using high grade plutonium in the bullet only.

After it was discovered that the "Thin Man" program would not be successful, Los Alamos redirected its efforts into creating the implosion-type plutonium weapon: "Fat Man". The gun program switched completely over to developing a uranium bomb.

Although in Little Boy  of 80%-grade U-235 was used (hence ), the minimum is about 44 to 55 pounds (20 to 25 kg), versus  for the implosion method.

Little Boy's target subcritical mass was enclosed in a neutron reflector made of tungsten carbide (WC). The presence of a neutron reflector reduced neutron losses during the chain reaction, and so reduced the quantity of uranium fuel needed. A more effective reflector material would be metallic beryllium, but this was not known until the postwar years when Ted Taylor developed an implosion design known as "Scorpion".

The scientists who designed the "Little Boy" weapon were confident enough of its success that they did not field-test a design before using it in war (though scientists such as Louis Slotin did perform non-destructive tests with sub-critical assemblies, dangerous experiments nicknamed tickling the dragon's tail). In any event, it could not be tested before being deployed, as there was only sufficient U-235 available for one device. Even though the design was never proof-tested, there was thought to be no risk of the device being captured by an enemy if it malfunctioned. 
Even a "fizzle" would have completely disintegrated the device, while the multiple redundancies built into the "Little Boy" design meant there was negligible if any potential for the device to strike the ground without detonating at all.

For a quick start of the chain reaction at the right moment a neutron trigger/initiator is used. An initiator is not strictly necessary for an effective gun design, as long as the design uses "target capture" (in essence, ensuring that the two subcritical masses, once fired together, cannot come apart until they explode). Considering the 70 spontaneous fissions per second, this only causes a delay of a few times 1/70 second, which in this case does not matter. Initiators were only added to Little Boy late in its design.

Proliferation and terrorism

With regard to the risk of proliferation and use by terrorists, the relatively simple design is a concern, as it does not require as much fine engineering or manufacturing as other methods. With enough highly enriched uranium, nations or groups with relatively low levels of technological sophistication could create an inefficient—though still quite powerful—gun-type nuclear weapon.

Comparison with the implosion method 

For technologically advanced states the gun-type method is now essentially obsolete, for reasons of efficiency and safety (discussed above). 
The gun type method was largely abandoned by the United States as soon as the implosion technique was perfected, though it was retained in the specialised role of nuclear artillery for a time. Other nuclear powers, such as the United Kingdom, and the Soviet Union never built an example of this type of weapon. Besides requiring the use of highly enriched U-235, the technique has other severe limitations. The implosion technique is much better suited to the various methods employed to reduce the weight of the weapon and increase the proportion of material which fissions. South Africa built around five gun-type weapons, and no implosion-type weapons. They later abandoned their nuclear weapon program altogether.  They were unique in their abandonment of nuclear weapons, and probably also by building gun-type weapons rather than implosion-type weapons.

There are also safety problems with gun-type weapons. For example, it is inherently dangerous to have a weapon containing a quantity and shape of fissile material that can form a critical mass through a relatively simple accident. Furthermore, if the weapon is dropped from an aircraft into the sea, then the moderating effect of the seawater can also cause a criticality accident without the weapon even being physically damaged. Neither can happen with an implosion-type weapon, since there is normally insufficient fissile material to form a critical mass without the correct detonation of the explosive lenses.

US nuclear artillery

The gun method has also been applied for nuclear artillery shells, since the simpler design can be more easily engineered to withstand the rapid acceleration and g-forces imparted by an artillery gun, and since the smaller diameter of the gun-type design can be relatively easily fitted to projectiles that can be fired from existing artillery.

A US gun-type nuclear artillery weapon, the W9, was tested on May 25, 1953 at the Nevada Test Site. Fired as part of Operation Upshot–Knothole and codenamed Shot GRABLE, a 280 mm shell was fired 10,000 m and detonated 160 m above the ground with an estimated yield of 15 kilotons. This is approximately the same yield as Little Boy, although the W9 had less than 1/10 of Little Boy's weight (365 kg vs. 4,000 kg, or 805 lbs vs. 8,819 lbs). The shell was 1,384 mm long.

This was the only nuclear artillery shell ever actually fired (from an artillery gun) in the US test program. It was fired from a specially built artillery piece, nicknamed Atomic Annie.  Eighty shells were produced from 1952–53.  It was retired in 1957.

The W19 was also a 280 mm gun-type nuclear shell, a longer version of the W-9. Eighty warheads were produced and the system was retired in 1963.

The W33 was a smaller, 8 inch (203 mm) gun-type nuclear artillery shell, which was produced starting in 1957 and in service until 1992. Two were test fired (detonated, not fired from an artillery gun), one hung under a balloon in the open air, and one in a tunnel.

Later versions were based on the implosion design.

List of US gun-type weapons

Bombs 
 Little Boy, 1945–1951
 Thin Man, cancelled
 Mark 8 (bunker buster), 1952–1957
 Mark 10, cancelled
 Mark 11 (bunker buster), 1956–1960

Artillery 
 W9, 1952–1957
 W19, 1955–1963
 W23, 1956–1962
 W33, 1957–1992

Others 
 T-4 Atomic Demolition Munition, 1957–1963
 W8 for the SSM-N-8 Regulus cruise missile, cancelled

References

External links
 Simulation of "Little Boy" an interactive simulation of the gun-type design atomic bomb "Little Boy"

Nuclear weapon design
Gun-type nuclear bombs
Nuclear fission